Black Dossier can refer to:

 Black Dossier (film), a 1955 French film
 The League of Extraordinary Gentlemen: Black Dossier, a graphic novel released November 14, 2007